Egilina callista is a species of sea snail, a marine gastropod mollusk in the family Pyramidellidae, the pyrams and their allies. The species is one of twelve known species within the Babella genus of Gastropods.

References

 Saurin, E. 1958. Pyramidellidae de Pho-Hai (Sud Viêt-Nam). Annales Faculté des Sciences (Saigon) 1958: 63−86, pl. 1−4

External links
 
 Dautzenberg P. & Fischer H. (1907 ["1906"]). Contribution à la faune malacologique de l'Indo-Chine. Journal de Conchyliologie. 54(3): 145-226, pls 5-7
 Melvill, J. C. (1910). A revision of the species of the family Pyramidellidae occurring in the Persian Gulf, Gulf of Oman and North Arabian Sea, as exemplified mostly in the collections made by Mr. F.W. Townsend (1893-1900), with descriptions of new species. iProceedings of the Malacological Society of London. 9: 171-207, pls 4-6

Pyramidellidae
Gastropods described in 1893